Ashton Hilliard Williams (August 15, 1891 – February 25, 1962) was a United States district judge of the United States District Court for the Eastern District of South Carolina.

Education and career

Born in Lake City, South Carolina, Williams received an Artium Baccalaureus degree from the University of South Carolina in 1912 and a Bachelor of Laws from Georgetown Law in 1915. He was in private practice in South Carolina from 1914 to 1952. He was a member of the Lake City Council from 1916 in 1917. He was a member of the South Carolina House of Representatives from 1921 to 1922, and then of the South Carolina Senate from 1923 to 1926. He served on the Democratic National Executive Committee from South Carolina from 1948 to 1949.

Federal judicial service

On June 17, 1952, Williams was nominated by President Harry S. Truman to a seat on the United States District Court for the Eastern District of South Carolina vacated by Judge Julius Waties Waring. Williams was confirmed by the United States Senate on July 2, 1952, and received his commission on July 3, 1952. Williams served in that capacity until his death on February 25, 1962.

References

Sources
 

1891 births
1962 deaths
University of South Carolina alumni
Georgetown University Law Center alumni
Members of the South Carolina House of Representatives
Judges of the United States District Court for the Eastern District of South Carolina
United States district court judges appointed by Harry S. Truman
20th-century American judges